On Broadway, Inc. is a non-profit organization located in Green Bay, Wisconsin, US. The Broadway District is boarded by Mather St. on the north, Mason Street on the south, Ashland Avenue on the west and the Fox River on the east. On Broadway, Inc. is part of the Main Street Programs in the United States. It follows a multi-part approach to revitalization. Each approach is overseen by a committee made up of volunteers.

History 
On Broadway was founded in 1995.

Events 
On Broadway is responsible for numerous events throughout the year.
 Farmers' Market On Broadway www.onbroadway.org/farmersmarket
 Taste On Broadway www.onbroadway.org/tasteonbroadway

Wal-Mart Controversy 
Wal-Mart offered to purchase the Larsen Canning Company industrial site, located in the Broadway District, from a governing board that includes the President and Executive Director of On Broadway, Inc.

References

External links

Organizations established in 1995
Non-profit organizations based in Wisconsin
Culture of Green Bay, Wisconsin
1995 establishments in the United States
Organizations based in Wisconsin